Jim Hodder (December 17, 1947 – June 5, 1990) was an American drummer, best known as an early member of Steely Dan.  After leading the Boston-based group The Bead Game, Hodder moved to Los Angeles to join the first lineup of Steely Dan.  He appeared on their first three albums before leaving the group in 1974.  He worked as a session musician before his 1990 death.

Biography

Early years, Bead Game
Hodder was born in the small Long Island hamlet of Bethpage, New York in 1947.  He graduated from Plainedge High School in the Plainedge Union Free School District in 1965 and relocated thereafter to the Boston area, where he became active in the local music scene.

As drummer and lead vocalist, he joined the Boston-based psychedelic rock group The Bead Game, named after Hermann Hesse's novel The Glass Bead Game. The group built a local following before attracting the attention of Avco Records and producer Gary Kannon, later known as Gary Katz.  Their first album, Baptism, was canceled, though it would receive a posthumous release in 1996 with a limited run.   In 1970 they appeared in the film The People Next Door in which they performed two songs, and soon thereafter recorded the album Easy Ridin''' as part of the collective Freedom Express. 1970 also saw the release of the band's only proper album, Welcome, on Avco/Embassy. This album showcased a late psychedelic/early progressive crossover sound, and featured Hodder singing lead vocals on all tracks.

Steely Dan
In 1972, Hodder accepted an invitation from Katz and Boston guitarist Jeff "Skunk" Baxter to relocate to Los Angeles and join Steely Dan, a new group built around songwriters Donald Fagen and Walter Becker with whom the two were working.  He made the move with his girlfriend Kathi Kamen Goldmark, later a successful author and musician.  He barely knew the other band members prior to beginning tracking for their first records.

Hodder acted as the group's drummer, but was also given occasional lead vocal duties thanks to Fagen's insecurities as a vocalist. He sang lead on "Dallas", the A-side of the initial Steely Dan single, and on "Midnite Cruiser" from the debut album, Can't Buy a Thrill.  The band soon embarked upon extensive touring in the wake of their early commercial success. Hodder appeared on Countdown to Ecstasy, a band-focused effort recorded the following year after the group's sound had cohered on the road.

Although still a band member, he played a diminished role on the studio-oriented third LP, 1974's Pretzel Logic.  With the drumming handled by session musician Jim Gordon and future Steely Dan member Jeff Porcaro, Hodder's role on the album was relegated to backup vocals.  The touring band assembled to promote the record featured simultaneous drumming from both Porcaro and Hodder.  Hodder was initially uncomfortable with the idea, but later acknowledged the creative potential of the setup. Both he and Baxter left the group after the tour, as Becker and Fagen relegated band activity to studio sessions with guest musicians.

Session work
Hodder continued working as a session musician.  He played drums on Linda Ronstadt's 1974 single "You're No Good", and tracks on the 1976 albums Nine on a Ten Scale by Sammy Hagar and Sibling Rivalry by The Rowans.  He later appeared as the sole drummer on David Soul's Playing to an Audience of One and Rocky Sullivan's 1984 Caught in the Crossfire'' record.

Death
On June 5, 1990, Hodder drowned in the swimming pool of his Point Arena, California home. He was 42 years old.

References

External links

1947 births
1990 deaths
Accidental deaths in California
American rock drummers
Deaths by drowning in California
People from Bethpage, New York
People from Point Arena, California
20th-century American drummers
American male drummers
20th-century American male musicians